Gary Keefer was born August 7, 1983 in Preston County, WV to Darla Wright Keefer and Mike Keefer. Gary is a professional drummer performing in Southern Maryland, and West Virginia. In a local paper Southern Maryland News, the band was featured under a 'Band of the Week' article. "A former state drum corps champion, Keefer has played country, hair metal and jazz. He also writes the lyrics."

He collaborated with Ryan Thompson in 2000, to form what later became Broken Stigma band.

Gary wrote lyrics and his performance was recorded on Broken Stigma's first album, Broken Glass on February 1, 2007. And also the second album The Road, released only electronically on CD baby.

As of November 2013 Gary sings and drums for Voodoo Monkey band, with former Broken Stigma members Erich Donahue, Andy Parker and Susie Parker.

References

American drummers
Musicians from Maryland
Living people
Year of birth missing (living people)